Anna Karenina (Hungarian: Karenin Anna) is a 1918 Hungarian silent drama film directed by Márton Garas and starring Irén Varsányi, Dezső Kertész and Emil Fenyvessy. It is an adaptation of the 1877 novel Anna Karenina by Leo Tolstoy. This is a Russian silent film based on the eponymous book by Leo Tolstoy. Anna Karenina is a young wife of an older husband. She is having an affair with the young and handsome Count Vronsky. Their mutual love is under social pressure. By following her desires Anna complicates her life and ends it in a suicide under a train.—Steve Shelokhonov

Plot summary

Cast
 Irén Varsányi as Anna Karenina 
 Dezső Kertész as Vronsky 
 Emil Fenyvessy as Karenin 
 Gyula Margittai as Oblovszkij 
 Jenö Balassa  
 Sándor Virányi as Levin doktor 
 Vilma Lakos  
 Karola Gárdi   
 Sandy Igolits  
 Sári Almási]  
 Adolf Sieder  
 Mária Gajáry

Bibliography
 Cunningham, John. Hungarian Cinema: From Coffee House to Multiplex. Wallflower Press, 2004.

References

External links
 

1918 films
Hungarian silent feature films
Hungarian drama films
1910s Hungarian-language films
Films directed by Márton Garas
Films based on Anna Karenina
Hungarian black-and-white films
Austro-Hungarian films
Silent drama films